, known as Manhunt, Hot Pursuit or Dangerous Chase in some translations, is a 1976 Japanese crime thriller film directed by Junya Satō. It is based on the novel of the same name by Juko Nishimura, and stars Ken Takakura in the leading role.

Despite an initial lack of success in Japan, the film went on to become an overseas blockbuster, estimated to have sold at least  tickets in China and the Soviet Union. This makes it the highest-grossing Japanese film of all time in box office ticket sales, as well as China's highest-grossing foreign film adjusted for inflation. It was remade by John Woo as Manhunt (2017).

Plot
Morioka, a prosecutor in Tokyo, is accused of theft by a woman and again by a man. The stolen items are found at his house, much to his bewilderment, and he flees out the bathroom window. Morioka's superior revokes his position as prosecutor and calls out a manhunt on him, assigning detective Yamura (from the Tokyo Metropolitan Police Department) to the case. Morioka tracks one of his accusers to Makami Village in the Noto Peninsula in Ishikawa Prefecture but finds her dead. Among her items he finds a wedding photo of her and the other accuser. After Morioka has left, the police later arrive and find the body, tracking her husband Yokomichi Keiji back to a town called Kounogi in Hokkaido, where they set up an ambush. Morioka soon arrives but manages to escape the chasing police.
While moving through the woods, Morioka notices and disarms a tripwire hooked to a shotgun then uses it to scare off a bear attacking a woman who is stuck up a tree. The bear chases Morioka off a cliff and into a river. The woman, Mayumi, rescues him and nurses him back to health at her family home. Morioka states that his name is Maeda but Mayumi's father Tonami Yohinori, who wants to run for governor, recognizes him as Morioka and offers to help. Tonami's assistant Nakayama calls the police in an attempt to help Tonami's political ambitions and Morioka flees the house. Mayumi follows him on horseback and helps him escape, confessing what she has done to Yamura when the police arrive at her house. Yamura follows her to a seaside shanty where Morioka is hiding and forces them back toward her house at gunpoint. While walking they are attacked by a bear and Yamura is clawed. Morioka helps the injured Yamura back to the hideout and cauterizes the wound with a burning branch. Yamura asserts that he will still arrest Morioka despite this but Morioka easily overpowers the weakened Yamura and escapes with Mayumi to a cave hideout. Mayumi's father finds them there and offers his private plane to Morioka so that he can hurry to Tokyo to find Yokomichi. Tonami then withdraws from the race for governor and sends Mayumi to Tokyo under the guise of concluding a business deal for him.
Morioka crash lands on a beach near Mito, sneaks past police roadblocks on a truck, and makes his way through the woods to Tokyo. He falls ill and is helped by an unknown woman who recognizes him from the wanted posters. The next night Morioka is spotted by police in Tokyo and chased through the crowded streets before being rescued by Mayumi on horseback leading a pack of horses that crashes through a shield wall set up by the police.
The next day Yamura arrives at Mayumi's hotel and shows Morioka a copy of Yokomichi's medical record from a mental hospital where he is being treated for paranoid schizophrenia under the name Suzuki Takeshi. He states that the hospital is operated by the Nagaoka Company owned by Representative Nagaoka Ryosuke. Representative Ryosuke was speaking with Representative Asakura before Asakura suddenly jumped out a window in an alleged suicide, an explanation that Morioka always doubted. The day before Asakura died, a large amount of money was extorted from him by the Tonan company, a company that also purchased guinea pigs from Yokomichi Keiji.
Morioka and Mayumi escape from the hotel before police can arrive. Yamura's superior reprimands him and reminds him of the five-year prison sentence that is mandatory for making deals with suspects. Morioka and Mayumi drive to the mental hospital, where they pretend that Morioka is her husband and have him committed. The doctor, Vice President Doto, recognizes Morioka and taunts him by showing him Yokomichi, who has been rendered incoherent by a strong sedative. Doto force-feeds the same sedative to Morioka and imprisons him in the mental hospital as a schizophrenic under the name Tsuyama and refuses to release him to Mayumi. Morioka intentionally spills some of the pills given to him so that he can pocket them. He slips a pill into Mayumi's hand when she visits and she takes it to Yamura.
Representative Ryosuke visits the hospital and is given a demonstration of the effects of the sedative known as "AX" that blocks parts of the brain responsible for will and makes those who take it obedient to commands. The doctor demonstrates this by commanding a patient to stab himself in the arm, which the patient does. The patient formerly headed the protests against Ryosuke's company but the new drug will be used as a means to get rid of people like him. Morioka, who has been vomiting up the pills after swallowing them, is instructed to write a suicide note then taken to a roof and instructed to jump. Morioka walks to the edge of the roof but instead of jumping he explains that he now understands that Asakura was convinced to jump after being given drugs by Nagaoka. The orderlies attempt to strangle Morioka as Yamura and Hosoi arrive. Doto runs from Yamura and commits suicide by jumping off the roof and Ryosuke's assistant Sakai is found dead as a result of suicide as well.
Morioka, Yamura, and Hosoi catch Ryosuke preparing to fly to South Korea with a briefcase full of dollars and Morioka explains that they know Asakura was blackmailing Ryosuke about the drug "AX". He continues that Ryosuke knew that he did not believe it was a suicide and therefore sent the Yokomichis to stop him. Morioka also recognizes Ryosuke's assistants as the men who killed Mrs. Yokomichi and later shot at him in Hokkaido. Yamura orders Hosoi to arrest Ryosuke's men and Ryosuke tells his men that he will get them out of jail the next day. Ryosuke attempts to leave for his flight but Yamura pulls out his gun and commands Ryosuke to jump out the window but Ryosuke fights back so Morioka and Yamura both shoot him and call it self-defense. The General Prosecutor accepts this explanation but states that Morioka will still have to face prosecution for some of his actions. Morioka explains that he now believes that some criminals cannot be battled with the law along and that he no longer wishes to be prosecutor. Yamura says that when he comes to arrest Morioka he will give him another chance to escape. Morioka leaves and meets Mayumi, explaining that they will have to live on the run. She accepts this and says that she will stay on the run with him.

Cast 
Ken Takakura as Morioka Fuyuto
Yoshio Harada as Detective Yamura
Kunie Tanaka as Yokomichi Keiji
Ryōko Nakano as Tonami Mayumi
Kō Nishimura as Nagaoka Ryokai
Hiroko Isayama as Yokomichi Kayo
Tappie Shimokawa
Mitsuko Baisho
Taketoshi Naito
Hideji Ōtaki as Tonami Yoshinori
Ryo Ikebe
Eiji Okada
Shin'ya Owada

Box office 
In Japan, the film earned  in distributor rental income.  rentals was equivalent to an estimated  ticket sales in 1976. The film was initially not well-received in Japan, where it was criticized by film critics for perceived flaws in its plot and characters. The film barely managed to break even at the Japanese box office.

In the Soviet Union, it was a major hit when it later released there in 1977. It sold  tickets at the box office in the Soviet Union.

In China, the film was released as 追捕 (Manhunt or Pursuit) in 1978. It was the first foreign film to be released in China after the Cultural Revolution ended in 1976. It became hugely popular in China at the time and Ken Takakura became very well known. The film sold  tickets in the city of Beijing alone during 1978.

It is the highest-grossing Japanese film of all time in terms of box office admissions. The film is estimated to have sold at least more than  tickets worldwide.

Adjusted for inflation, it is China's highest-grossing foreign film of all time. Its inflation-adjusted gross revenue in China is estimated to be at least  in 2017.

Legacy 
As the first foreign film to release in China after the Cultural Revolution ended, it became hugely popular in China at the time and Ken Takakura became very well known. The film had an impact on modern Chinese culture, introducing many Chinese to the outside world, including Japanese popular culture, technology, infrastructure and street fashion. When Ken Takakura died of lymphoma in November 2014, a huge number of Chinese Internet users expressed their sympathies and condolences, including many celebrities in the Chinese movie industry. The spokesman of China's Ministry of Foreign Affairs, Hong Lei, said that Takakura made significant contributions to the cultural exchange between China and Japan.

Remake 

Hong Kong action film director John Woo announced at the 2015 Cannes Film Festival that he was directing a remake of Kimi yo Fundo no Kawa o Watare. In March 2016, it was confirmed that Zhang Hanyu, Masaharu Fukuyama, and Qi Wei would be starring in the film. Ha Ji-won was additionally confirmed as being attached to the project. Lee Byung-hun was slated to join, but had to drop out due to scheduling conflicts. Taking place and being shot in Japan, the film will have Chinese, Korean, and English dialogue.

References

External links

 MYDRAMALIST ENTRY
 Script in English

1976 films
1970s chase films
1970s crime thriller films
1970s action thriller films
Films based on Japanese novels
Films directed by Junya Satō
Films set in Tokyo
Films set in Hokkaido
Films set in Ibaraki Prefecture
Films about lawyers
1970s Japanese-language films
Japanese action thriller films
Japanese crime thriller films
Shochiku films
1970s Japanese films